HD 177809 is a 6th magnitude star in the constellation Lyra, approximately 700 light years away from Earth. It is a red giant star of the spectral type M2III, meaning it possesses a surface temperature of under 3,500 kelvins. In comparison to the Sun, it is much larger and brighter, but its surface is cooler.

References

Lyra (constellation)
177809
M-type giants
7238
093720
Durchmusterung objects